Men's ice hockey tournaments have been staged at the Olympic Games since 1920. The men's tournament was introduced at the 1920 Summer Olympics, and permanently added to the Winter Olympic Games in 1924. Romania has participated in four tournaments: 1964, 1968, 1976, and 1980. A total of 7 goaltenders and 45 skaters have represented Romania at the Olympics.

Doru Tureanu has scored the  most goals, 11, and points, 19, while Eduard Pană has the most assists, 10. Pană and Dezideriu Varga competed in the most Olympics, three, while Varga has played the most games, 18. Pană and Tureanu are the only two Romanian players to have been inducted into the IIHF Hall of Fame, in 1998 and 2011, respectively.

Key

Goaltenders

Skaters

Notes

References
 
 
 

ice hockey
Romania
Romania